Gerald Kersh (26 August 1912– 5 November 1968) was a British and later also American writer of novels and short stories.

Biography
Born in 1912, Kersh began to write at the age of eight. After leaving school, he worked as, amongst other things, a cinema manager, bodyguard, debt collector, fish and chip cook, travelling salesman, French teacher and all-in wrestler whilst attempting to succeed as a writer.

Kersh's first novel, Jews Without Jehovah, an autobiographical tale of growing up poor and Jewish, was published in 1934. Kersh, however, had not sufficiently concealed the identities of some of the characters, and a member of his family sued for libel; as a result, the book was quickly withdrawn. Night and the City (1938), was more successful and has been filmed twice, with Richard Widmark in 1950 and then in 1992 with Robert De Niro in the lead role (this version transposed the setting from London to New York).

Kersh was drafted into the army during the Second World War, served in the Coldstream Guards and ended up writing for the Army Film Unit. Despite apparently deserting, Kersh ended up in France during the liberation, where he discovered that many of his French relatives had ended up in Hitler's extermination camps. After the war, Kersh continued to enjoy commercial success, mainly because of his short stories, in genres such as horror, science fiction, fantasy and the detective story. From about the mid-1950s onwards, he started to suffer from poor health and financial hardship (specifically relating to his failure to pay income tax). However, Kersh continued to publish novels and stories, some of which were commercially and critically successful.  In 1958, his short story "The Secret of the Bottle", originally published in The Saturday Evening Post, received an Edgar Award from the Mystery Writers of America. The following year he became a U.S citizen.

Style
In the late 1930s, Kersh said that his novels published to that date "haven't really been fiction at all" and "contained an irreducible minimum of made-up-stuff".  His novels (although not his short stories) typically depict the low life and eccentric characters of London, implying that they are written from Kersh's own experience and are semi-autobiographical.  Night and the City has a plot involving professional wrestling, and in Fowler's End the protagonist is a cinema manager/chucker-out, both roles featuring in Kersh's non-writing career.

Critical reputation
As Kersh's popularity did not survive his death in 1968, it is not easy to find copies of most of his works.  In recent years, however, he has received some critical attention, and SF author Harlan Ellison stated that Kersh was his favourite author. Writing to a fan, Ellison recommended Kersh, writing, "you will find yourself in the presence of a talent so immense and compelling, that you will understand how grateful and humble I felt merely to have been permitted to associate myself with his name as editor."

The protagonist of his short story "Whatever Happened to Corporal Cuckoo?" appears in the third chapter of The League of Extraordinary Gentlemen, Volume III: Century. There, the character identifies himself as "Colonel Cuckoo".

Anthony Boucher noted that Kersh was "incapable of writing a dull sentence."

Kersh is one of eight writers commemorated in Compass Road, a watch design by Crispin Jones and writer Iain Sinclair. Kersh was listed #9 in Time Out'''s "Top 30 chart of London's most erotic writers".

Works
A prolific writer, he has been described as "hammering out twenty novels, twenty collections of short stories and thousands of articles in different publications, hacking pseudonymously as Piers England, Waldo Kellar, Mr Chickery, Joe Twist, George Munday, and others", some of his notable publications being:Jews without Jehovah (1934)Men Are So Ardent (1935)Night and the City (1938) ( - reprint); also titled DishonourI Got References (1939), storiesThey Die with Their Boots Clean (1941)The Nine Lives of Bill Nelson (1942)Brain and Ten Fingers (1943)Selected Stories (1943)The Dead Look On (1943)Faces in a Dusty Picture (1944)The Horrible Dummy and Other Stories (1944)The Weak and the Strong (1945)An Ape, a Dog and a Serpent (1945)Sergeant Nelson of the Guards (1945)Clean, Bright and Slightly Oiled (1946), storiesNeither Man nor Dog: Short Stories (1946)Sad Road to the Sea (1947), storiesThe Song of the Flea (1948)Clock Without Hands (1949), storiesThe Thousand Deaths of Mr. Small (1951)The Brazen Bull (1952), storiesPrelude to a Certain Midnight (1953)The Great Wash (1953), issued as The Secret Masters in the USThe Brighton Monster and Other Stories (1953)Guttersnipe (1954), storiesMen Without Bones (1955), storiesFowler's End (1958)On an Odd Note (1958), storiesMen Without Bones (US) (1960), storiesThe Ugly Face of Love and Other Stories (1960)The Best of Gerald Kersh (1960), edited by Simon RavenThe Implacable Hunter (1961)The Terribly Wild Flowers: Nine Stories (1962)More Than Once Upon a Time (1964), storiesThe Hospitality of Miss Tolliver (1965), storiesA Long Cool Day in Hell (1966)The Angel and the Cuckoo (1966)Nightshade and Damnations (1968), stories, edited by Harlan EllisonBrock (1969)Karmesin: The World's Greatest Criminal – or Most Outrageous Liar (Crippen & Landru, 2003), storiesThe World, the Flesh, & the Devil: Fantastical Writings, Volume I (Ash-Tree Press, 2006), stories

Rediscovery and new editions

In 2013 Valancourt Books began reprinting many of Kersh's titles.Nightshade and Damnations (1968), with an introduction by Harlan Ellison (Reprinted in 2013)Fowlers End (1957), with an introduction by Michael Moorcock (Reprinted in 2013)Neither Man Nor Dog (1946), with an introduction by Robert Webb (Reprinted in 2015)Clock Without Hands (1949), with an introduction by Thomas Pluck (Reprinted in 2015)The Great Wash (aka The Secret Masters) (1953) (Reprinted in 2015)On an Odd Note (1957), with an introduction by Nick Mamatas (Reprinted in 2015)

References

Further reading
David Langford, "Kersh, Gerald", in David Pringle, ed., St. James Guide to Horror, Ghost and Gothic Writers'' (Detroit: St. James Press, 1998)

External links
The Nights and Cities of Gerald Kersh

1912 births
1968 deaths
English short story writers
English horror writers
English fantasy writers
English science fiction writers
English Jewish writers
Military personnel from Middlesex
British Army personnel of World War II
Coldstream Guards soldiers
Edgar Award winners
People from Teddington
20th-century English novelists
20th-century British short story writers
British emigrants to the United States